Tom Isaacs (born 18 February 1987) is a Welsh rugby union player who played for the Cardiff Blues. A centre, he represented the Wales sevens squad in 2009 and was part of the squad that won the 7s World Cup in Dubai.

Isaacs joined the Ospreys from Newport Gwent Dragons in April 2009.
On 26 March 2014, Isaacs will join Gloucester Rugby in the English Aviva Premiership from the 2014–15 season. However, due to fierce competition for first-team places, he left Gloucester with immediate effect, to join his home region Cardiff Blues on a one and a half-year deal until the end of the 2015–16 season.
Tom has now moved to Hong Kong and is currently playing rugby at Hong Kong Football Club as a semi professional, he is also working as a physical education teacher at King George the Fifth School in Hong Kong

References

External links
Newport Gwent Dragons profile
Ospreys profile
Gloucester Rugby profile

Welsh rugby union players
Newport RFC players
Dragons RFC players
Ospreys (rugby union) players
Living people
Rugby union players from Cardiff
1987 births
People educated at Ysgol Gyfun Gymraeg Glantaf
Gloucester Rugby players
Cardiff Rugby players
Rugby union centres